Ces gens-là is the ninth studio album by Jacques Brel. Also known as Jef, it was released in 1966 by Barclay (80323). The album was reissued on 23 September 2003 under the title Ces Gens-Là as part of the 16-CD box set Boîte à Bonbons by Barclay (980 817-2).

Track listing 

 Tracks 1–10 constituted the original 1966 album.
 Tracks 11–14 were originally issued on EP Barclay 70907 EP 45, of which the orchestral sessions were recorded on 8 January 1963, with separate vocals by Brel added later. These tracks do not belong to the original album 'Ces Gens-là' but were added when it was reissued as part of the 16-CD box set Boîte à Bonbons.

Personnel 

 Jacques Brel – composer, vocals
 François Rauber – orchestra conductor
 François Rauber et Son Orchestre - accompaniment 
 Gérard Jouannest – piano
 Jean Corti - accordion
 Gerhardt Lehner – recording engineer & audio mixing (uncredited)
 Jean-Marie Guérin – mastering
 Hubert Grooteclaes – photography

References 

Jacques Brel albums
1966 albums
Barclay (record label) albums
French-language albums
Universal Records albums
Albums conducted by François Rauber